Jacinto Grau Delgado (1877 – 14 August 1958) was a Spanish writer. Best known for his plays, and his theoretical approach to theater, he also wrote essays, short stories, and criticism.

Life 
Grau was born in Barcelona. He served as the Envoy Extraordinary and Minister Plenipotentiary of Loyalist Spain to Panama during the Spanish Civil War. Following the war he emigrated to Argentina, where he died in exile in 1958.

Career 
Grau published twenty-five plays over the course of fifty-five years. His most celebrated work is El señor de Pigmalión (1921), which remained relatively unknown in Spain during his lifetime, though it was successful in Europe and Latin America. Grau has stated that he writes plays 'with the greatest intensity possible within the limits of classical harmony'.:23-24

His work is 'anti-realistic', and heavily influenced by George Bernard Shaw, as well as Henrik Ibsen, Jean Anouihl and Buero Vallejo.:269-70 His contemporary critics 'universally' identified his theatre as avant-garde, though Grau 'scorned avant-garde theatre'. Modern scholars have identified him as a 'psychological idealist'.:23

He was nominated for a Nobel Prize in Literature in 1949.

Plays

References 

1877 births
1958 deaths
Spanish dramatists and playwrights
Spanish male dramatists and playwrights
Spanish emigrants to Argentina